John Ingram (1565 – 26 July 1594) was an English Jesuit and martyr from Stoke Edith, Herefordshire, who was executed in Gateshead on 26 July 1594, during the reign of Elizabeth I.

Life
Ingram was probably the son of Anthony Ingram of Wolford, Warwickshire, by Dorothy, daughter of Sir John Hungerford. He began his education in Worcestershire and attended New College, Oxford. He then converted to Catholicism and studied at the English College, Rheims,   at the Jesuit College, Pont-a-Mousson, and at the English College, Rome. He was ordained at Rome in 1589. He then spent some time in Europe before leaving for the English mission.

He set out in early 1592, but bad weather forced the ship off course and he was put ashore near Dunbar and began his ministry in the Border area. While in Scotland he was sheltered and assisted by Lords Huntly, Angus, and Erroll, the Abbot of Dumfries, and other local aristocrats. He acted as chaplain to Walter Lindsay of Balgavie for 18 months. 

In late 1593 Ingram was forced to flee briefly to England. He stayed some time at Wark on Tweed and was captured at Norham while attempting to return. He was first imprisoned at Berwick, then moved to Newcastle upon Tyne, then York, and finally to the Tower of London. During this time he wrote Latin epigrams, 20 of which survive. 

Ingram arrived at the Tower of London on Holy Saturday, 17 April 1593, and later wrote: 
Rocks are quarried, the entrails of the earth,  
That Dives may have living rock for his tomb.  
No tomb seek I; and yet shall there be a living tomb  
For my lifeless body — the carrion-crow.

With dark humor, Ingram indicates that he is well aware of the fate that awaits him, and that the bodies of those so condemned were usually quartered and publicly exposed rather than given a decent burial.  

In London he was severely tortured by priest hunter  Richard Topcliffe. He was hung by the joints of his fingers and arms, and was in extreme pain for so long that the feeling of his senses was taken completely from him. He was often put to the rack, but would no information about persons and places. 

He was taken from London on 13 July to return to York prison with another Catholic priest, John Boste. The two prisoners' feet were tied under their horse's belly, for fear of them trying to escape. Care was also taken that the horses were kept far enough apart to prevent the prisoners having any communication with each other throughout the journey. When they arrived in York, Ingram was in solitary confinement in a stinking vault of a locked jakehouse for four days, without either bed to lie on or stool to sit on. From York he was transported to Newcastle and imprisoned in the Newgate prison there for four nights, probably from 19 to 22 July. 
A woman visitor to the prison was struck by the serenity and joy of the priest, who said that he had good cause to be merry, because his wedding-day being at hand, the bridegroom must be glad, for within ten days he hoped to enjoy his Spouse. She remarked that it was true his hope was good, but his banquet was deadly; but he answered that the reward was sweet. The serenity and courage of John Ingram is reflected in two letters he wrote from prison to his friends or fellow prisoners in the same prison: "I look for my trial on Thursday and consequently for my death in God's honour ( ...) in my pained body; my spirit is not pained, nor in any disaster, distress or durance."

Death
At Durham Assizes he was tried with John Boste and George Swallowell, a converted Protestant minister. There on 23 July 1594 Ingram and Boste were convicted under 27 Eliz. c. 2 which made the mere presence in England of a priest ordained abroad high treason, even though there was no evidence that Ingram had ever exercised any priestly function in England. 
 
There is evidence that someone in Scotland offered the English Government a thousand crowns to spare Ingram's life, all in vain. Matthew Hutton (1529-1606), the Bishop of Durham, acting for the Crown, preached a sermon before the judges, adjuring them to prosecute with all vigour the law against seminary priests, their aiders and abettors.   After the intervention of the Bishop of Durham before the court, the trial was a foregone conclusion and John Ingram, John Boste and a layman George Swallowell, were sentenced to death on Wednesday 24 July. When John Ingram was asked according to the usual formula, what he had to say that he should not receive judgement, he made this answer, "I say that I am a priest, and that my exercise and practice of priesthood cannot be made treason by any Christian law; and I beseech God to forgive both you and them that make it otherways. And I do with all my heart forgive you, and all my accusers and persecutors, and so I beseech God to have mercy upon me, and to strengthen me with patience and constancy in mine agony."

As the authorities in Newcastle were responsible for executions on Tyneside, Ingram was transferred to Newgate Prison in Newcastle and on the day of execution, Friday 26 July, he was taken from the prison across the bridge (now where the Swing Bridge is located) to the scaffold in Gateshead High Street which was directly opposite what was known at the time as the Papist Chapel, the Chapel of St Edmund Bishop and Confessor. Immediately prior to his execution he was held for a short while in the Toolboth in Gateshead, a small local gaol very close to the place of execution. Holtby gives an account of Ingram's preparations, the prayers he said, his words to the bystanders, and of the execution itself: "I take God and his holy angels to the record, that I die only for the holy Catholic faith and religion, and do rejoice and thank God with all my heart that hath made me worthy to testify my faith therein, by the spending of my blood in this manner."

He was asked to pray for the Queen and he prayed God that she might long reign to his glory, and that it might please him to procure her to live and die a good Catholic Christian prince. With rope around his neck he said more prayers, ending with the psalm Miserere mei Deus (Have mercy on me, O God), after which, making the sign of the Cross and saying, "In manus tuas ,,." (Into Thy hands I commend my spirit), the ladder was turned; and being dead, he was cut down, bowelled, and quartered. His severed head was placed on a spike and displayed on the bridge across the Tyne. John Ingram was twenty nine years of age.

The costs of the execution were as follows in Newcastle City Accounts Book: "Paide for charges att the execution of the semynarie priete in Gateside John Ingram – 2 shillings and 6 pence. Paide for hinginge his quarters of the gibbettes: 18 pence and for panyer which brought his quarters to towne 4 pence – 22 pence. Paide for a locke for towlboothe dore in Gateside – 3 shillings 4 pence."

In Rome, at the English College, when the news of his martyrdom reached there, the staff and students sang the Te Deum in the college chapel and wrote against his name "Martyro insigni coronatus".

Veneration
He was beatified in 1929 by Pope Pius XI and his anniversary is 24 July.

Blessed John Ingram Commemorative Walk
In the 1920s, Father Joseph Starr, who had had a particular devotion to the Gateshead martyr, would retrace Ingrams's route from the location of the prison where he was held to the site of his execution. A few years after the Canonization of the Forty Martyrs of England and Wales in 1970, members of the St Vincent de Paul Society Conference at Corpus Christi Catholic Church in the Bensham area of Gateshead revived this custom to recall John Ingram and promote the cause for his canonization. 

Each year, in cooperation with the Anglican Community of Gateshead a commemorative walk in honr of Blessed John Ingram takes place on the Sunday nearest 26 July. The walk commences from St Andrew's Anglican Church in Newcastle, (the former site of Newgate Prison) crosses the Tyne by way of the Swing Bridge (on the site of the Old Tyne Bridge); the route taken by the execution party proceeds to the Anglican church of St Edmund (Holy Trinity Church) on the High Street. At the time of the Protestant Reformation this church was referred to as "the papist chapel", and the authorities chose to execute John Ingram in front of this chapel, dedicated to St Edmund of Canterbury, as a warning to any Catholics in Tyneside.

Father Paul J. Zielinski, of St. Augustine's, Felling, Tyne and Wear has written a book, John Ingram Priest and Martyr 1565-1594, which discusses the effect of the Protestant Reformation on Tyneside.

See also
 Catholic Church in the United Kingdom
 Douai Martyrs

References

Sources
 Paul J Zielinski, (2019) John Ingram Priest and Martyr 1565-1594 a personal presentation of the Gateshead martyr in the Elizabethan era. 2019, Gateshead.

1565 births
1594 deaths
Alumni of New College, Oxford
Executed people from Herefordshire
Jesuit martyrs
16th-century English Jesuits
Converts to Roman Catholicism from Anglicanism
English College, Reims alumni
Venerated Catholics
Martyred Roman Catholic priests
People executed under the Tudors for treason against England
16th-century Roman Catholic martyrs
16th-century venerated Christians
People executed under Elizabeth I
One Hundred and Seven Martyrs of England and Wales